Kanekotrochus vietnamensis is a species of sea snail, a marine gastropod mollusk in the family Trochidae, the top snails.

Description
The size of the shell varies between 12 mm and 20 mm.

Distribution
This marine species occurs off Vietnam

References

External links
 Gastropods.com: Kanekotrochus vietnamensis $

vietnamensis
Gastropods described in 2006